The Hyosung GV650 Aquila is a cruiser style motorcycle.  Its V-twin engine is also found in the GT650R and GT650S sportbikes. The engine looks similar to the one found in the Suzuki SV650 by general layout, however sizes of practically all elements differ and the parts are not interchangeable.

Model-specific features
GV650 has a belt drive, contrary to GT650 with which it shares an engine. Unlike the GT650, it has 5 speeds. In both cases, the rev limiter is at 10500RPM, but the GV650 has no rev counter.

By design, the motorcycle can be started with the kickstand down when it's gear is in the neutral position.

The headlamp for all models is always turned on when the keys are turned, in accordance with US and Canadian DLR regulations.

US-distributed vehicles have factory-mounted passive orange light reflectors on the sides of the radiator cover and red reflectors on the sides of the rear registration plate.

It has two separate odometers as well as a total distance counter.

The motorcycle has no gear position indicator, however multi-position gear sensor is wired to the ECU in the EFI versions.

Carburetor (non-EFI) versions have a green LCD display meter, EFI versions have a white LCD.

EFI versions display a motor fault (red FI error lamp on display) before starting the motor.

In EFI versions, ECU numeric error codes can be seen as a read-out instead of speed on the display meter, if one switches the (optional) diagnostic switch after starting the motor (keeping the switch on prevents it from starting the motor).

Fuel consumption averages 42MPG (US) or 5.6l/100km but this includes mostly earlier carburetor based models, on the other hand, the data is based on typically longer US travel distances.

External links
HYOSUNG GV 650 Owner's Manual (carburetor), ManualsLib.com
HYOSUNG GV 650 Pro/EFI Owner's Manual, ManualsLib.com
HYOSUNG GV 650 Pro/EFI Service Manual, ManualsLib.com
Model information, Hyosung

References 

GV650
Mirage Power
Cruiser motorcycles